= Khanatti =

- Village
- Country: India
- State: Karnataka
- District: Belagavi
- Talukas: Gokak

Population (2001)
  - Total: 3,500

Languages
  - Official: Kannada English
- Time zone: UTC+5:30 (Indian Standard Time IST)
- PIN: 591312 at post khanatti tq gokak dist belegavi
- Telephone code: 08334
- Vehicle registration: KA 49
- Nearest city: Mudalgi
- Sex ratio: 65:35 % ♂/♀
- Website: www.orkut.com/khanatti

Khanatti is a village in Belagavi district in Karnataka, India.
